Michael Scott Bankhead (born July 31, 1963) is an American former professional baseball pitcher who played in Major League Baseball (MLB) from -. Bankhead also pitched for Team USA in the 1984 Olympic Games. He attended the University of North Carolina.

Early life and education
Michael Scott Bankhead was born on July 31, 1963, in Raleigh, NC.  He graduated from Reidsville High School in Reidsville, NC, and attended the University of North Carolina at Chapel Hill. In 1981 and 1982, he played collegiate summer baseball with the Wareham Gatemen of the Cape Cod Baseball League and was named a league all-star in 1982.

Professional career

Kansas City Royals
Bankhead was drafted by the Kansas City Royals in the first round, 16th pick, of the 1984 Major League Baseball Draft.

He appeared in only 31 games in the minors before being called up by the Royals. He made his Major League debut on May 25, going four innings, giving up two hits and striking out four while giving up no earned runs to get his first win. He finished the '86 season going 8–9 with a 4.61 ERA in 24 games, 17 for starts.

Seattle Mariners
On December 10, he was traded by the Royals with Mike Kingery and Steve Shields to the Seattle Mariners for Rick Luecken and Danny Tartabull. In his first month with the Mariners, Bankhead went 4–1 with a 2.94 ERA, but he developed tendinitis and ended the season with a dismal 9–8 record and 5.42 ERA.

He finished the '89 season going 14–6 with a 3.34 ERA and was named co-MVP of the team along with Alvin Davis.

In his next two seasons shoulder trouble would limit Bankhead to just 21 appearances. On December 20, he was granted free agency.

Cincinnati Reds
On January 22, he signed as a free agent with the Cincinnati Reds. He would revive his career and in just one season he was 10–4 with a 2.93 ERA in 54 games. On April 24, 1992, Bankhead picked up his only MLB career save during a marathon 16 inning victory over the Padres. Bankhead pitched a scoreless 16th inning to close out a 7-6 Reds victory.  On October 28, he was granted free agency.

Boston Red Sox
Bankhead was signed as a free agent with the Boston Red Sox on December 8, 1992.

New York Yankees
On September 1, Bankhead was purchased by the New York Yankees from the Red Sox but never played for them that season because of the strike. He was granted free agency at the end of the season but re-signed with the Yankees. In , Bankhead went 1–1 in 20 games, including one start. On July 25, he was released by the Yankees.

Oakland Athletics
On August 4, Bankhead signed as a free agent with the Oakland Athletics but never made an appearance for them at the Major League level. He was released by the A's on September 10.

See also
 Baseball at the 1984 Summer Olympics

References

External links

 Scott Bankhead at SABR (Baseball BioProject)

1963 births
Living people
All-American college baseball players
American expatriate baseball players in Canada
Baseball players from North Carolina
Bellingham Mariners players
Boston Red Sox players
Calgary Cannons players
Cincinnati Reds players
Edmonton Trappers players
Kansas City Royals players
Major League Baseball pitchers
Medalists at the 1984 Summer Olympics
Memphis Chicks players
New York Yankees players
North Carolina Tar Heels baseball players
Olympic silver medalists for the United States in baseball
Omaha Royals players
Pawtucket Red Sox players
San Bernardino Spirit players
Seattle Mariners players
Wareham Gatemen players
Baseball players at the 1984 Summer Olympics